In statistics, the Box–Cox distribution (also known as the power-normal distribution) is the distribution of a random variable X for which the Box–Cox transformation on X follows a truncated normal distribution. It is a continuous probability distribution having probability density function (pdf) given by

for y > 0, where m is the location parameter of the distribution, s is the dispersion, ƒ is the family parameter, I is the indicator function, Φ is the cumulative distribution function of the standard normal distribution, and sgn is the sign function.

Special cases
 ƒ = 1 gives a truncated normal distribution.

References

Continuous distributions